This is a list of Latvian words borrowed from Old East Slavic (or its dialects where particularly ts–ch are merged) during 8th–13th centuries.

Dating

Comparison of letters

List of words
List structure:
 Old East Slavic: Latvian "meaning"
 [] contain alternative/other form

Orthodoxy
 крьстъ: krusts [krists] "cross". Possibly 'u' from Latin crux "cross".
 божьница: baznīca [baznîca] "church".
 говѣти: gavēt [gavêt] "to fast"
 грамота: grāmata [grãmata] "book"
 грѣхъ: grēks [grę̀ks] "sin"
 хоругꙑ: karogs [karuõgs] "flag, banner"
 недѣлꙗ: nedēļa [nedẽļa] "week"
 *свѧтъкъ [свꙗтокъ]: svētki [svę̀tki] "holiday, celebration"
 свѧтъ: svēts [svę̀ts] "holy, sacred"
 звонъ: zvans "bell"
 поганъ: pagãns "pagan, heathen". Alternatively from Latin.

Society or government
 рубежь: robeža [rùobeža] "border, frontier"
 сѫдъ: sods [sùods] "penalty, punishment".
 тълкъ: tulks [tũlks, tul̃ks] "interpreter, translator"
 погостъ: pagasts "parish?"
 право: prāva [prāvas] "lawsuit?"
 пълкъ: pulks [pùlks, pul̂ks] "regiment"
 страдати: strādāt [stràdât] "to work"
 человѣкъ [*чьловѣкъ]: cilvēks [cìlvę̃ks] "human, person"
 мѣсто: miẽsts "village"
 боꙗринъ: bajãrs "boyar"
 сѫди: sùoģis "judge"

Trading
 търгъ: tirgus [tìrgus] "market". Unless related ('ъ' > 'u' is expected).
 безмѣнъ: bezmēns [bęzmę̄ns, vęzmę̄ns] "steelyard"
 цѣна: cena "price"
 мꙑто: muita [muĩta] "customs (duty)"
 скупъ: skops [skùops] "stingy, miserly"

Household
 кожухъ: kažoks [kažuõks] "fur coat"
 мѫка: mokas [muõkas] "torment, agony"
 сума: soma [suoma] "bag"
 истъба: istaba [istuba, ustaba, ustuba] "room (building)"
 дуда: dūdas [dũda] "bagpipe"
 котьлъ: katls "boiler"
 кꙑсель: ķīselis "kissel"
 мѧтьлъ: mētelis [mètelis] "coat (garment)"
 сапогъ [забогъ]: zābaks (zàbaks) "boot (footwear)".
 жьзлъ: zizlis [zizls] "wand, baton"
 ножь: nazis "knife"
 стькло: stikls "glass"

Other
 *Кривъ: krìevs "Russian (person)". Compare Russian кривичи "Krivichs".
 пустъ: posts [puõsts]
 богатъ: bagāts [bagâts] "rich, wealthy"
 думати: domāt [duõmât] "to think"
 дума: doma [duõma] "thought, idea, opinion"
 умъ: oma [uôma] "mood (mind)". Or at least partly inherited.
 сулити: solīt [sùolît] "to promise"
 хꙑтръ: neķītrs "obscene, dirty, lewd"
 поваръ: pavārs [pavãrs] "cook"
 капуста: kāposti [kàpuõsts] "cabbage"
 сѣра: sērs [sę̃rs] "sulfur"
 бѣда: bēda [bę̀da] "sorrow, grief"

References

Further reading
 

 
 
 

Latvian language
Eastern Orthodoxy in Latvia
Old_East_Slavic